Toro is a comune (municipality) in the Province of Campobasso in the Italian region Molise, located about  east of Campobasso.

Toro borders the following municipalities: Campodipietra, Jelsi, Monacilioni, Pietracatella, San Giovanni in Galdo.

References

External links
 Official website

Cities and towns in Molise